Numerous video games based on the popular science-fiction series Doctor Who have been officially released. To date, there have been over 19 Doctor Who video games on various platforms, including apps on mobile phones.

Released games

Cancelled games
A game for the Sega Mega Drive was reportedly in development by Sega around the time of the movie but never released.
IR Gurus were reportedly working on a game to coincide with the 2005 series of the show featuring the Ninth Doctor and Rose. It was in development for half a year but was cancelled with the reason being "it’s complicated".

Related games

References

Lists of video games by franchise
Video games based on Doctor Who